William Levi Draycott (15 February 1869 – May 1943) was an English footballer who played as a right half for Burslem Port Vale, Stoke, Burton Wanderers, Newton Heath, Bedminster, Bristol Rovers, Wellingborough, and Luton Town in the 1890s and early 1900s.

Career
Draycott probably joined Burslem Port Vale in the summer of 1890. He made his debut at the Athletic Ground in a 2–1 friendly defeat to West Bromwich Albion on 29 September 1890. He made nine appearances for the club, bagging two goals and was a member of the side that shared the North Staffordshire Charity Challenge Cup in 1891.

He transferred to local rivals Stoke in June 1891, where he played in just two the Football League matches in three seasons at the Victoria Ground. He then spent the 1894–95 and 1895–96 seasons with Football League newcomers Burton Wanderers, scoring three goals in 50 league games.

He joined Newton Heath in May 1896. He scored five goals in 1896–97 to help the club secure second place in the Second Division; however they lost to Sunderland in the promotion/relegation Test Match. Newton Heath then finished fourth in 1897–98 and 1898–99, with Draycott only finding the net on one further occasion. Over three years he made 91 appearances for the Manchester club before transferring to Bedminster in 1899. Bedminster finished sixth in the Southern League in 1899–1900. He then spent the 1900–01 campaign with rivals Bristol Rovers, before moving on to Wellingborough and Luton Town.

Career statistics
Source:

Honours
Burslem Port Vale
North Staffordshire Charity Challenge Cup: 1891

References

1869 births
People from Swadlincote
People from Newhall, Derbyshire
Footballers from Derbyshire
English footballers
Association football wing halves
Port Vale F.C. players
Stoke City F.C. players
Burton Wanderers F.C. players
Manchester United F.C. players
Bedminster F.C. players
Bristol Rovers F.C. players
Wellingborough Town F.C. players
Luton Town F.C. players
English Football League players
Southern Football League players
1943 deaths